Karen An-hwei Lee (born 1973) is an American poet.

Life
Born in 1973, and raised in Massachusetts, Lee is a Chinese American poet, translator, and critic.  She earned an M.F.A. in creative writing from Brown University and a Ph.D. in literature from the University of California, Berkeley. A former resident writing fellow at the MacDowell Colony for the Arts in Peterborough, New Hampshire and the Millay Colony for the Arts in Austerlitz, New York, Lee resided in Santa Ana, California. She became vice provost for Point Loma Nazarene University in 2016. In 2020, she became provost for Wheaton College.

Her first poetry book, In Medias Res: a primer of experience in approximate alphabetical order, was selected by poet Heather McHugh and published by Sarabande Books in 2004. Lee received six Pushcart Prize nominations, a National Endowment for the Arts Grant,  the Poetry Society of America's Norma Farber First Book Award, the Kathryn A. Morton Prize for Poetry from Sarabande Books, and the July Open sponsored by Tupelo Press.

Her poetry and fiction has appeared in Greensboro Review, Prairie Schooner, Columbia Poetry Review, and a number of other publications.  She is the author of a chapbook, God's One Hundred Promises (Swan Scythe Press, 2002), and additional full-length poetry collections, including Ardor (Tupelo Press, 2008) and Phyla of Joy: Poems (Tupelo Press, 2012). In 2017, Ellipsis Press published her first novella, Sonata in K.

Awards
 2019 Big Other Book Award for Fiction
 2005 National Endowment for the Arts Literature Grant  
 2004 Poetry Society of America's Norma Farber First Book Award. 
 2004 Kathryn A. Morton Prize for Poetry, Sarabande Books 
 2002 Swan Scythe Press Prize 
 Eisner Prize, University of California, Berkeley
 Yoshiko Uchida Foundation Fellowship
 Beinecke Foundation Fellowship
 John Hawkes Prize, Brown University

Works

Poetry books

Nonfiction books

References

External links
 "VG:Interview",  Bryan Thao Worra, Asian American Press

1973 births
Living people
Brown University alumni
University of California, Berkeley alumni
American women poets
21st-century American poets
21st-century American women writers
Place of birth missing (living people)